"Real+" is mini plus album by South Korean singer-songwriter IU. It was released as a single album, titled Real+ and distributed by LOEN Entertainment on February 16, 2011. The single, a follow-up to Real (2010), consists of three tracks in total. One song in the album, "Only I Didn't Know", appears twice – the second time as a collaboration piece with pianist Kim Gwang-min.

Background and release
The music video for the lead track, "Only I Didn't Know", features actress Park Bo-young as she is caught in a dramatic break-up story. Her ex-lover is played by singer-songwriter Yoon Sang, who also composed this piece as a gift for IU. The music video was released on the same day as the album.

The song itself is a departure from the pop-like sounds of her previously promoted song, "Good Day". It features a mature combination of IU's striking high notes, vocals and orchestral instrumentation.

IU made her promotional comeback with "Only I Didn't Know" in the television show Music Bank (KBS) on February 18, 2011, two days after the album's release.

As of 2011, the album sold over 23,500 copies in South Korea.

Track listing

Notes
 The titles of both tracks 1 and 3 literally mean "Only I Didn't Know".
 Track 3 is a piano version of "Only I Didn't Know".

Charts

Weekly charts

Monthly charts

Year-end charts

Awards and nominations

Annual music awards

Cover versions
 South Korean singer Lee Eun-mi covered "Only I Didn't Know" on the singing competition program I Am a Singer.
 South Korean singer K.Will covered "Only I Didn't Know" on Mnet's singing competition show Singer Game.

Release history

See also
 List of number-one hits of 2011 (South Korea)

References

External links
 
 
 
 IU's official website

2011 songs
IU (singer) songs
Korean-language songs
Songs with lyrics by Kim Eana